Craig Mitchell Handy (born September 25, 1962) is an American tenor saxophonist.

Born in Oakland, California, he attended North Texas State University from 1981 to 1984, and following this played with Art Blakey, Wynton Marsalis, Roy Haynes, Abdullah Ibrahim, Elvin Jones, Joe Henderson, Betty Carter, George Adams, Ray Drummond, Conrad Herwig, Dee Dee Bridgewater, and David Weiss among many others. He is a member of the Mingus Big Band, Mingus Dynasty, and Mingus Orchestra.

Handy plays the role of Coleman Hawkins in the 1996 film Kansas City . He is credited for performing the Cosby Show season 6 theme.

Discography

As leader

As sideman
With Cecil Brooks III
Hangin' with Smooth (Muse, 1990)
With George Cables
The George Cables Songbook (HighNote, 2016)
With Betty Carter
Droppin' Things (Verve, 1990)
With The Cookers
Warriors (Jazz Legacy Productions, 2010)
Cast the First Stone (Plus Loin, 2011)
Believe (Motema Music, 2012)
With Ray Drummond
Excursion (Arabesque, 1993)
1-2-3-4 (Arabesque, 1997 [1999])

With Joe Henderson
Big Band (Verve, 1997)

With Freddie Hubbard
New Colors (Hip Bop Essence, 2001)
On the Real Side (Times Square, 2008)

With Bobby Hutcherson
Acoustic Masters II (Atlantic, 1994)

With Abdullah Ibrahim
Mindif (Enja, 1988)

With Charles Mingus
Epitaph (Columbia, 1990)

With Ralph Peterson
ALIVE At Firehouse 12 Vol. 1—The Unity Project (Onyx, 2013)

With John Scofield
Up All Night (Verve, 2003)

With Charles Sullivan
Kamau (Arabesque, 1995)

With Jack Walrath
Journey, Man! (Evidence, 1995)

References

Further reading
 Baker's Biographical Dictionary of Musicians, Ninth edition, edited by Laura Diane Kuhn (born 1953), Schirmer Books, New York (2001), 
 The New Grove Dictionary of Jazz, Second edition, Three volumes, edited by Barry Dean Kernfeld (born 1950), Macmillan Publishers, London (2002),

External links
 Official website

American jazz saxophonists
American male saxophonists
African-American jazz musicians
Jazz musicians from California
Living people
1962 births
University of North Texas College of Music alumni
Arabesque Records artists
21st-century American saxophonists
21st-century American male musicians
American male jazz musicians
Mingus Big Band members
Mingus Dynasty (band) members
The New Jazz Composers Octet members
Okeh Records artists
21st-century African-American musicians
20th-century African-American people